The list of ship commissionings in 1975 includes a chronological list of all ships commissioned in 1975.


See also 

1975